Kalombo N'Kongolo (17 July 1961 – 10 March 1993) was a Congolese professional footballer who played as a central defender.

Club career
Blessed with a powerful physique, N'Kongolo was born in Kinshasa, and spent most of his professional career in Portugal, where he arrived at the age of 26 signing for modest S.C. Espinho in the Primeira Liga. His solid performances attracted the attention of FC Porto.

In his sole season at Porto, N'Kongolo appeared in 17 matches – 16 starts – as his team finished second to S.L. Benfica. He returned to Espinho for three further campaigns, with the club now in the Segunda Liga. On 10 March 1993, after spending a few months with Atlético Clube de Portugal in the third division, the player died from a brain embolism; he was only 31 years old.

International career
N'Kongolo was part of the Zaire squad at the 1988 African Cup of Nations held in Morocco, playing two games in an eventual group-stage exit.

References

External links

1961 births
1993 deaths
Footballers from Kinshasa
Democratic Republic of the Congo footballers
Association football defenders
Belgian Pro League players
RFC Liège players
Primeira Liga players
Liga Portugal 2 players
Segunda Divisão players
S.C. Espinho players
FC Porto players
Atlético Clube de Portugal players
Democratic Republic of the Congo international footballers
1988 African Cup of Nations players
Democratic Republic of the Congo expatriate footballers
Expatriate footballers in Belgium
Expatriate footballers in Portugal
Democratic Republic of the Congo expatriate sportspeople in Belgium
Democratic Republic of the Congo expatriate sportspeople in Portugal